Postgraduate Applications Centre (PAC) is an organisation that processes applications for large number of  postgraduate courses in the Republic of Ireland.

Institutions which currently accept applications through PAC are Dublin City University, University College Cork, Waterford Institute of Technology, NUI Maynooth, Galway-Mayo Institute of Technology, Cork Institute of Technology,  Institute of Technology, Carlow and NUI Galway. The Centre also processes applications for inter-institute qualifications, such as the Professional Diploma in Education, and qualifications in Public Health Nursing and Midwifery.

The centre was founded in 1998 as a separate company by the National University of Ireland to simplify the processing of postgraduate applications, initially to the Diploma in Education and expanding to include various institutes of higher education in the state.

The Centre is a non-profit organisation which is funded entirely by application fees.

See also
 Education in the Republic of Ireland

External links
 Official site

Educational organisations based in Ireland
National University of Ireland
University and college admissions
Non-profit organisations based in the Republic of Ireland
Organizations established in 1998